La Flocellière is a former commune in the Vendée department in the Pays de la Loire region in western France. On 1 January 2016, it was merged into the new commune of Sèvremont.

See also
Communes of the Vendée department

References

Former communes of Vendée